The Ministry of Energy is the main body in the system of central government of Ukraine responsible for realization of electric power-generating state policies; nuclear-industrial, and oil-gas complexes often referred simply as the Fuel-Energy Complex.

The government ministry was originally formed in 1970s as Ministry of Energy and Electrification.

Functions
 state governing of the Fuel-Energy Complex
 ensuring the realization of the state policies in the Fuel-Energy Complex
 ensuring energy security of the State
 participation in the formation, regulation, and improvement of the fuel-energy resource market
 developing proposals to improve economic incentives in stimulation of the Fuel-Energy Complex development

Vectors of specialization
 Power generation
 Nuclear power
 Oil and Gas industry
 Coal mining

Fuel Energy Complex Associations

Power Generation
 National Nuclear Power-generating Company Energoatom
 Khmelnytskyi Nuclear Power Plant
 Rivne Nuclear Power Plant
 South Ukraine Nuclear Power Plant
 Zaporizhzhia Nuclear Power Plant
 Donuzlav WES (Wind Power Plant)
 other supporting companies
 Sevastopol Institute of Nuclear Power an Industry
 State Research Company "Tsyrkoniy"
 Chornobyl Center on issues of Nuclear Security, Radioactive Waste and Radioecology
 Industrial Reserve-Investment Fund in Development of Energy
 Ukrenerhokomplekt
 Ukrainian Nuclear Association
 Ukrinterenergo
 State Enterprise National Power Company Ukrenerho
 Derzhenerhonahlyad (State Energy Supervision)
 Derzhinspektsia (State Inspection)
 Centrenergo
 Ukrhydroenergo (100%)
 Dniester Hydro-accumulating Power Station (87.4%)
 others

Oil/Gas and Oil Refinery industries
 National Joint-Stock Company Naftogaz Ukrainy
 Subsidiary Company Ukrgasproduction
 Open Joint-Stock Company Ukrnafta (50% + 1)
 Subsidiary Joint-Stock Company Chornomornaftogaz
 Overseas branches
 other enterprises

Small share participants
 Donbasenergo (25.0%)
 DTEK Dniproenergo (25.0%)

Former members
 State Special Enterprise Chernobyl Nuclear Power Plant was created on July 11, 2001 on base of the former Energoatom's company of the same name. The company was basically recommissioned under a special jurisdiction for the further decommissioning of its nuclear power station. On July 15, 2005 the enterprise was transferred from under the jurisdiction of the Ministry of Fuel and Energy to the Ministry of Emergencies.
 National Joint-Stock Company Energy Company of Ukraine

History
Previous names:
 1982–1997 Ministry of Energy and Electrification
 1997–1999 Ministry of Energy
 1999–2010 Ministry of Fuel and Energy
 2010–present Ministry of Energy and Coal Mining

The ministry also absorbed a separate Ministry of Coal Mining which existed since 1954 until 1999 and was revived in 2005-2010.

The Ministry was (as it turned out) temporally merged the ministry with the Ministry of Ecology and Natural Resources by Honcharuk Government (on 29 August 2019). But the succeeding Shmyhal Government re-created the Ministry of Ecology and Natural Resources (on 27 May 2020).

Ministers

List of Ministers of Energy and Electrification

List of Ministers of Energy

List of Ministers of Fuel and Energy

List of Ministers of Coal Mining 
Ministry of Coal Mining of Ukraine existed at least since 1954.

List of Ministers of Energy and Coal Mining

List of Ministers of Energy and Environmental Protection

List of Ministers of Energy

See also
Nuclear power in Ukraine
Ministry of Emergencies (Ukraine)
Ministry of Industrial Policy (Ukraine)
DTEK
List of power stations in Ukraine

References

External links 
 
 
 
 

 
Fuel and Energy
Fuel and Energy
Energy in Ukraine
Energy ministries
Mining ministries